Ray Charles and Betty Carter is a 1961 album by Betty Carter and Ray Charles. The pair's recording of "Baby, It's Cold Outside" on the album topped the R&B charts.  A 1988 CD/LP re-issue included three bonus tracks and the 1998 Rhino Records re-issue combined, on a single CD, the original Ray Charles and Betty Carter with the complete Dedicated to You.

Track listing

Original LP release
"Ev'ry Time We Say Goodbye" (Cole Porter)  – 4:41
"You and I" (Meredith Willson)  – 3:28
Intro: "Goodbye"/"We'll Be Together Again" (Gordon Jenkins)/(Carl T. Fischer, Frankie Laine)  – 3:20
"People Will Say We're in Love" (Oscar Hammerstein II, Richard Rodgers)  – 2:51
"Cocktails for Two" (Sam Coslow, Arthur Johnston)  – 3:15
"Side by Side" (Harry M. Woods, Gus Kahn)  – 2:23
"Baby, It's Cold Outside" (Frank Loesser)  – 4:10
"Together" (Lew Brown, Buddy De Sylva, Ray Henderson)  – 1:35
"For All We Know" (J. Fred Coots, Sam M. Lewis)  – 3:44
"Takes Two to Tango" (Al Hoffman, Dick Manning)  – 3:22
"Alone Together" (Howard Dietz, Arthur Schwartz)  – 4:45
"Just You, Just Me" (Jesse Greer, Raymond Klages)  – 2:04

Bonus tracks on 1988 CD/LP re-issue
 "But On the Other Hand Baby" (Charles, Percy Mayfield) – 3:11
"I Never See Maggie Alone" (Harry Tilsley, Everett Lynton) – 5:37
"I Like to Hear It Sometime" (Jodie Edwards) – 2:50

Additional tracks on 1998 Rhino Records re-issue
all 12 tracks from Dedicated to You

Personnel
 Betty Carter - vocals
 Ray Charles - vocals, keyboards
Original LP tracks
Hank Crawford - alto saxophone
David Fathead Newman - tenor saxophone
Leroy Cooper - baritone saxophone
Bill Pitman - guitar
Edgar Willis - bass guitar
Mel Lewis, Bruno Carr - drums
The Jack Halloran Singers - background vocals
Marty Paich - arranger, conductor
Sid Feller - producer

Recorded - Radio Recorders, Hollywood on June 13–14, 1961.

References and external links
ABC S 385

1961 albums
Betty Carter albums
Ray Charles albums
Albums conducted by Marty Paich
Albums arranged by Marty Paich
Albums produced by Sid Feller
Vocal duet albums
ABC Records albums